Andrii Kozynko (born June 27, 1994) is a Ukrainian male acrobatic gymnast. With partners Oleksandr Nelep, Oleksii Lesyk and Viktor Iaremchuk, Kozynko achieved 5th in the 2014 Acrobatic Gymnastics World Championships.

References

External links
 

1994 births
Living people
Ukrainian acrobatic gymnasts
Male acrobatic gymnasts